The Ordnance QF 3 pounder 2 cwt gun was a 47 mm British tank gun based on the Ordnance QF 3 pounder Vickers naval gun, mounted on Vickers-built tanks in the 1920s and 1930s. The gun was produced in 31 calibre (59 inch) and 40 calibre (74 inch) versions. The weapon only fired a solid shot, and was stated in the requirements of the A6 series of Vickers Medium tanks to have the ability to penetrate the armour of contemporary hostile tanks at a range of 1000 yards. The Vickers Medium Mark I was equipped with the Ordnance Quick Firing 2cwt Mark I version of the weapon, whilst from the Vickers Medium Mark II the Mark II version of the 3-pounder was utilized.

Even though other European countries still fielded similar weapons (e. g., Cannone da 47/32) at the start of the Second World War (and quite a few years into it), due to its comparatively low muzzle velocity the 3-pounder was considered obsolete by the war start by the British, with the Ordnance QF 2-pounder replacing it as the standard tank gun of British tanks.

Usage
Vickers Medium Mark I
Vickers Medium Mark II
Medium Mark III
A6E1
Vickers A1E1 Independent
Vickers 6-Ton

See also
List of tank main guns

References
 Anthony G Williams, 38-47 MM CALIBRE CARTRIDGES
David Fletcher, 'British Battle Tanks: World War I to 1939', Oxford: Osprey Publishing

QF 3 pounder
World War II tank guns
World War II artillery of the United Kingdom
Tank guns of the United Kingdom
Military equipment introduced in the 1920s